Rotarun Ski Area is a modest ski area in central Idaho, less than three miles (5 km) west of Hailey in Blaine County.  The elevation of its summit is 5,895 feet (1,797 m) above sea level, with a vertical drop of 475 feet (145 m) on its treeless north-facing slopes of Art Richards Mountain. A Poma lift was installed in 1998; it replaced a J-bar lift that had served since 1964. The primary lift before the J-bar was a rope tow.

The facility has operated since the 1950s and offers an affordable alternative for alpine skiing for the Wood River Valley.

Supported by community volunteers and donations, Rotarun operates on Wednesday and Friday nights and weekend days; it is the only ski area for night skiing within a three hours' drive (Bogus Basin, northeast of Boise).

Daily lift tickets  were $15 (and $10 for youths 6–17); season passes were $75 for adults, $50 for youths, and $150 for families.

See also

List of ski areas and resorts in the United States#Idaho
Comparison of North American ski resorts

References

External links
  
  – Rotarun ski area, 2011-03-19
 Ski Map.org – trail maps – Rotarun
 

Ski areas and resorts in Idaho
Buildings and structures in Blaine County, Idaho
Tourist attractions in Blaine County, Idaho